Pyry Soiri (born 22 September 1994) is a Finnish professional footballer who plays as a midfielder for HJK in the Veikkausliiga and the Finland national team. Born to a Finnish mother, Iina Soiri, and a Namibian father, he spent most of his childhood in Africa. He began his senior career at the age of 17 playing for MYPA. Soiri made his international debut for Finland in November 2017 and has since had over 20 caps. He appeared in 9 out of 10 of Finland's UEFA Euro 2020 qualification matches and helped Finland national team for the first time secure its place in European Football Championship tournament's group stage.

Club career

MYPA
Soiri spent his last years on youth level in MYPA and debuted in Veikkausliiga in April 2012 in a match against Jaro. During season 2012 he was also loaned out to Kakkonen teams JäPS and KTP. During season 2013 he secured his place in the team and gained 22 caps and 1 goal.

VPS
In 2015 Soiri transferred to VPS signing a two-year deal.

Shakhtyor Soligorsk
In February 2017 Soiri signed a deal with Belarusian Premier League Shakhtyor Soligorsk.

Admira Wacker
In August 2018 Soini transferred to Austrian Bundesliga Admira Wacker.

Esbjerg
Danish club Esbjerg fB announced on 18 June 2019, that they had signed Soiri on a contract until June 2022. However, after 54 appearances and five goals, the spell was cut short, when he got his contract terminated by mutual agreement on 25 August 2021.

HJK
On 4 October 2021, he signed a two-year contract with HJK, beginning in the 2022 season.

International career
On 6 October 2017, Soiri made his debut for Finland's senior national team in a qualifying match for the 2018 World Cup against Croatia. Brought on as a substitute late in the match, he scored the equalising goal for the 1–1 draw in the 90th minute. Soiri was called up for the UEFA Euro 2020 pre-tournament friendly match against Sweden on 29 May 2021. In UEFA Euro 2020 Group B he gained one cap for Finland on 16 June 2021 in a match against Russia when he replaced Jukka Raitala as a substitute on 75th minute of the match.

Career statistics

Club

International

.

International goals

As of match played on 16 June 2021. Scores and results list Finland's goal tally first.

References

External links

 Esbjerg fB official profile
 Pyry Soiri – SPL competition record
   
 

Living people
1994 births
Finnish people of Namibian descent
Finnish footballers
Association football midfielders
Finland youth international footballers
Finland under-21 international footballers
Finland international footballers
Finnish expatriate sportspeople in Belarus
Veikkausliiga players
Belarusian Premier League players
Austrian Football Bundesliga players
Danish Superliga players
Danish 1st Division players
Myllykosken Pallo −47 players
Kotkan Työväen Palloilijat players
Vaasan Palloseura players
FC Shakhtyor Soligorsk players
FC Admira Wacker Mödling players
Esbjerg fB players
Helsingin Jalkapalloklubi players
UEFA Euro 2020 players
Finnish expatriate footballers
Expatriate footballers in Belarus
Finnish expatriate sportspeople in Austria
Expatriate footballers in Austria
Finnish expatriate sportspeople in Denmark
Expatriate men's footballers in Denmark
Järvenpään Palloseura players
Sportspeople from Uusimaa
Finnish expatriates in Tanzania